(born June 4, 1977) is a female Japanese visual novel character designer and illustrator who works for Navel.

Hiro Suzuhira and Aoi Nishimata have known each other from high school; their first work, Ritual, was introduced in 1996.  In 2003, she joined Navel along with Hiro Suzuhira, illustrating Shuffle!. She then went on to make Really? Really! and We Without Wings (Oretachi ni Tsubasa wa Nai).

On April 23, 2016, Nishimata announced her marriage to voice actor Junichi Miyake via her blog. The ceremony was held on May 5, 2015 at Tokyo Disneyland. Nishimata also announced that she published a book containing wedding photo and an essay, titled  on June 24, 2016.

Works

Video games

Anime

Books

Contributor
 Star Wars Art: Visions (2010)
 Higashi Nihon Daishinsai Charity Dōjinshi (The Great Eastern Japan Earthquake Charity Dojinshi)  (2011)

References

 Book references

External links
   
 

1977 births
Living people
Anime character designers
People from Tachikawa